The Roman Catholic Diocese of Terrassa  is a diocese located in the city of Terrassa in the Ecclesiastical province of Barcelona in Catalonia, Spain.

History
 June 15, 2004 - Established as Diocese of Terrassa from the Metropolitan Archdiocese of Barcelona.

Leadership
Bishops
 José Ángel Saiz Meneses (2004.06.15 – 2021.04.17)
 Salvador Cristau Coll (3 December 2021 – present)

Auxiliary bishops
 Salvador Cristau Coll

See also
Roman Catholicism in Spain

Sources
 GCatholic.org
 Catholic Hierarchy
  Diocese website

References

External links
 Official website

Roman Catholic dioceses in Catalonia
Roman Catholic dioceses in Spain
Christian organizations established in 2004
Roman Catholic dioceses and prelatures established in the 21st century